Luis Viscarra (born 23 August 1960) is a Bolivian alpine skier. He competed in the men's slalom at the 1988 Winter Olympics.

References

1960 births
Living people
Bolivian male alpine skiers
Olympic alpine skiers of Bolivia
Alpine skiers at the 1988 Winter Olympics
Sportspeople from La Paz